Liao Junjian (born 27 January 1994) is a Chinese footballer who currently plays for Chinese Super League side Meizhou Hakka.

Club career 
Liao Junjian started his football career when he was promoted to Dongguan Nancheng's first team in the 2011 season. He transferred to China League One side Guangdong Sunray Cave in July 2012.

On 27 February 2015, Liao moved to League One club Hebei China Fortune after Guangdong Sunray Cave dissolved. On 15 April 2015, he made his debut for Hebei in a Chinese FA Cup match against his hometown club Guangxi Longguida. Liao made his league debut for Hebei on 2 May 2015 in a 2–0 home victory against Dalian Aerbin, coming on as a substitute for Xu Xiaolong in the 84th minute. He played 21 league matches for the club in the 2015 season, as Hebei China Fortune won promotion to the Chinese Super League after they finished the second place of the league. On 4 March 2016, Liao made his Super League debut in a 2–1 away win over Guangzhou R&F. He assisted Gervinho's winning goal in the match. He was the regular starter of the club, appearing 28 league matches of 30 in the 2016 season.

Liao injured during the preseason training of 2017 season. He lost his position to Chinese international Zhao Mingjian and Zhang Chengdong after he returned to field in May 2017. In July 2017, Liao was loaned to fellow first-tier club Chongqing Lifan until 31 December 2017. He didn't appear for Chongqing throughout the entirety of his loan spell. 

On 26 February 2018, Liao was loaned to China League One club Wuhan Zall for the 2018 season. He made his debut for the club on 11 March 2018, playing the whole 90 minutes in a 1–0 away win over Shanghai Shenxin. On 5 May 2018, he scored his first goal for Wuhan by shooting the equalizer in the injury time in a 2–2 away draw against Zhejiang Greentown. Liao played 29 league matches out of 30 in the 2018 season as Wuhan Zall won the title of the league and promoted to the first-tier. Liao made a permanent transfer to Wuhan Zall on 25 February 2019.

On 22 March 2022, Liao transferred to Chinese Super League club Meizhou Hakka. He would go on to make his debut in a league game on 4 June 2022 against Tianjin Jinmen Tiger in a 1-1 draw. This would be followed by his first goal for the club, which was in a league game on 12 November 2022 against Guangzhou City in a 1-0 victory.

Career statistics 
.

Honours

Club
Wuhan Zall
China League One: 2018

References

External links
 

Living people
1994 births
Association football defenders
Chinese footballers
Footballers from Guangxi
Guangdong Sunray Cave players
Hebei F.C. players
Chongqing Liangjiang Athletic F.C. players
Wuhan F.C. players
Meizhou Hakka F.C. players
People from Beihai
Chinese Super League players
China League One players
China League Two players
Footballers at the 2014 Asian Games
Asian Games competitors for China